BioTek Instruments was a privately held Vermont–based manufacturer that sells scientific instruments and associated software used in basic research in the life sciences as well in quality assurance in related industries. The company was founded in 1968 by University of Vermont Medical College physiologist Dr. Norman Alpert and engineer George H. Luhr, who directed the college's instrumentation and model facility. Alpert's son, Briar took over as CEO in 2001.  The company manufactures its products at its headquarters in Winooski, Vermont. The site was expanded in 2009, and again in 2017.
In 2019 Agilent Technologies acquired Biotek for $1.165 billion.

The company originally manufactured devices used to test and calibrate medical equipment, and in the 1980s started to develop then sell microplate readers; in 2002 the company sold off the testing device business to focus on microplates.  By 2013 its lines of business included microplate readers, washers, dispensers and related software, as well as related laboratory automation equipment; it was developing a microscopy line as well.  As of 2013 it had around 350 employees, with around 250 in Vermont and the rest in sales in other US states and major markets worldwide.

References

Privately held companies based in Vermont
Winooski, Vermont
1968 establishments in Vermont
American companies established in 1968
Instrument-making corporations
Manufacturing companies based in Vermont